Johnson City High School is a public high school located in Johnson City, New York, a village in Broome County adjacent to Binghamton. It is operated by Johnson City Central School District. The school, originally situated on Main Street in downtown Johnson City, was relocated to where it currently stands on Reynolds Road.

Academics

The Johnson City Guidance Office asserts that the "Johnson City Senior High School provides a comprehensive program in curricular, co-curricular and extracurricular activities designed to permit the development of programs that enable pupils to identify their talents, skills, strengths, and special interests." As of 2016, ten AP courses are offered as well as a number of dual-credit and honors courses.

Athletics

After facing flooding in 2006 and again in 2011, the Johnson City High School football field located at Greensfield (aka Northside Park) was left in a dilapidated state, as the 8 feet of standing water heavily ruined the bleachers, scoreboard, concession stand, restrooms, and team rooms. The varsity football team played their home games at Binghamton High School's Alumni Stadium from 2011–2013. The school district was allocated disaster relief funds courtesy of FEMA, and after a district wide budget election a new stadium on campus was approved and constructed. The grand opening of the new 'Wildcat Stadium' was held in 2014 which was ultimately fitted with bleachers, restrooms, a concession stand, and team rooms.

References

External links
 
 Village of Johnson City

Public high schools in Broome County, New York